Dafne Molina Lona (born February 24, 1982, in Mexico City, Distrito Federal) is a Mexican designer, model and beauty pageant titleholder who represented her country in the Miss World 2005 pageant, held in Sanya, China on December 10, 2005.

Biography
Prior to becoming a beauty queen, Dafne Molina participated in Elite Model Look Mexico 2002 and later received her diploma in interior design. On September 10, 2004, she competed in the national beauty pageant Nuestra Belleza México, held in San Luis Potosí. Placing second to Laura Elizondo of Tamaulipas, who became Miss Mexico Universe, Molina obtained the title of Miss Mexico World, which gave her the right to represent Mexico in the Miss World pageant. There, Molina placed as the First Runner-up to Unnur Birna Vilhjálmsdóttir of Iceland and obtained the title of Miss World Americas 2005. She also placed third in the Beach Beauty contest. On September 2, 2005, Dafne Molina was succeeded by Karla Jiménez of the state of Puebla.

See also
 Laura Elizondo
 Nuestra Belleza México 2004
 Miss World 2005

References

External links
Official Website
Dafne Molina at the Miss World Website
 Official Nuestra Belleza Mexico Website

1982 births
Living people
Nuestra Belleza México winners
Miss World 2005 delegates
People from Mexico City